Afrasura amaniensis is a moth of the subfamily Arctiinae which  is endemic to Tanzania.

References

External links

amaniensis
Moths described in 2006
Endemic fauna of Tanzania
Erebid moths of Africa